Funambola is an album of the Italian singer Patrizia Laquidara, released in 2007 by Ponderosa Music&Art.
It includes 13 songs and it is inspired by the French tightrope walker Philippe Petit, who walked on a steel wire between the Twin Towers of New York City.
Tightrope walking has this time both a physical and an intimate meaning, as a never ending research of a mental equilibrium, perhaps lasting, when found, only the space of a morning.
Intimate thought and introspection are actually the main themes of Patrizia Laquidara's songs.

Tracks

 Pioggia senza zucchero – 3.36 – (P. Laquidara)
 Se qualcuno – 3.45 – (P. Laquidara, A. Canto)
 Senza pelle – 4.00 – (G. Casale – R. Tarantino)
 Nuove confusioni – 4.00 – (P. Laquidara)
 L'equilibrio è un miracolo – 4.08 – (P. Laquidara, E. Cirillo – A. Canto)
 Le cose – 3.08 – (P. Laquidara, Kaballà – P. Laquidara, G. Mancini)
 Addosso – 3.20 – (P. Laquidara – A. Canto)
 Ziza – 3.49 – (A. Canto, P. Laquidara – A. Canto)
 Chiaro e gelido mattino – 4.12
 Oppure no – 2.57 – (P. Laquidara, A. Canto)
 Va dove il mondo va – 4.22 – (G. Fabbris – J. Barbieri)
 Personaggio – 5.07 – (A. M. Lindsay, M. Gibbs, Kassin –  P. Laquidara, L. Gemma)
 Noite e luar – 4.14 – (P. Laquidara)

Singles
 Le cose, released in 2007.
 Ziza, released in 2008, was also used for a video and to present the Lisbon concert in 2009, during the Festa do Cinema Italiano film festival.
 Personaggio, released in 2008, was also the soundtrack of the presentation spot of the Festa do Cinema Italiano film festival (Lisbon and Porto).

Soundtracks
 Noite e luar, in Manuale d'amore, directed by Giovanni Veronesi, released in 2005.

External links
 Funambola

References 

Patrizia Laquidara albums
2007 albums